The U.S. VIII Corps was a corps of the United States Army that saw service during various times over a fifty-year period during the 20th century. The VIII Corps was organized 26–29 November 1918 in the Regular Army in France and demobilized on 20 April 1919. The VIII Corps was soon reactivated, being constituted in the Organized Reserves in 1921. It was allotted to the Regular Army in 1933 and activated on 14 October 1940 at Fort Sam Houston, Texas. The VIII Corps fought across Europe from Normandy to Czechoslovakia in World War II. After World War II, the corps was inactivated and reactivated several times, with the final inactivation occurring in 1968.

Normandy

Commanded by Major General Troy H. Middleton, VIII Corps was made operational in Normandy on 15 June 1944, and took up defensive positions west of Carentan on the Cotentin Peninsula as part of the U.S. First Army. Attacking in early July, the corps pushed through bocage country, taking La Haye-du-Puits and the Mont Castre forest. After closing on the Ay and Sèves Rivers, VIII Corps joined the allied breakout from Normandy (Operation Cobra) on 26 July 1944. On 28 July, the corps took the key road junction of Coutances and liberated Avranches two days later.
8th Corp was based in the UK at Camp Burlish aka Camp Bewdley along with 12th Corp. Camp No.2 can still be visited today.

Brittany
In a controversial adherence to the original allied plan for the invasion of Normandy, the U.S. 12th Army Group commander, Lieutenant General Omar N. Bradley, directed VIII Corps westward into Brittany on 1 August 1944, with the object of liberating the Breton ports for Allied use. This decision was later deemed a poor use of the two armored divisions in the corps, which could have been used far more profitably in the rapid allied advance eastward across France. On 7 August 1944, the corps took the port of Saint-Malo. After an involved battle lasting almost six weeks and characterized by urban combat and reduction of fortifications, VIII Corps liberated Brest on 19 September 1944. Ironically, after so much effort, German demolition proved so effective that the liberated Breton ports were unusable for the remainder of the war. See Battle for Brest for more details.

Ardennes
Reorganizing after the operations in Brittany, VIII Corps moved east to join the rest of the allied forces along the border of Germany. Still part of Ninth Army, the corps took over the front in the Ardennes along the Our River and the Schnee Eifel on 4 October 1944. Because this area of the front was so quiet, the corps was used as an orientation and rest area for new U.S. divisions and divisions that had taken heavy casualties while fighting in the Hürtgen Forest. This mission continued until 16 December 1944, when the Germans attacked VIII Corps with over 20 divisions in what came to be known as the Ardennes Offensive, better known as the Battle of the Bulge.

Faced with overwhelming odds, the northern units of the corps, the U.S. 14th Cavalry Group and the U.S. 106th Infantry Division were pushed back or encircled. On the Schnee Eifel, some 6,700 inexperienced soldiers of VIII Corps were taken prisoner by the Germans. Further south, however, other units of the corps conducted a fighting withdrawal that successfully delayed the Germans long enough for the allies to rush reinforcements to the Ardennes. Units of the corps, in particular the U.S. 101st Airborne Division, famously held the key road junction of Bastogne against a five-day German siege that was broken on 26 December 1944, by armored units of the U.S. Third Army advancing from the south. Four days later, VIII Corps counter-attacked toward the town of Houffalize. On 16 January 1945, the corps made contact with the U.S. First Army near Houffalize, effectively pinching off the western end of the "bulge" made in allied lines by the German attacks. The corps reentered Luxembourg on 22 January 1945, and six days later reached the Our River again.

To the Rhine
In the first week of February 1945, the corps again occupied the Schnee Eifel and pushed through the Siegfried Line. VIII Corps took Pruem on 12 February 1945 and then cleared Siegfried Line fortifications in the corps area for the remainder of the month. On 6 March 1945, the corps crossed the Kyll River and reached the Rhine River at Andernach on 9 March 1945. On 16 March 1945, the corps assaulted across the Moselle River near Dieblich, and took Koblenz in a three-day battle that ended on 19 March 1945. Against stiff German resistance, VIII Corps assaulted across the Rhine River at Boppard and pushed eastward into central Germany.

Final operations
Moving north of Frankfurt am Main at the end of March 1945, the corps moved into the Rhön Mountains by early April. In the first two weeks of April 1945, VIII Corps cleared the Thuringer Wald and crossed the Gera, Saale, White Elster, and Mulde rivers in swift succession. By order of the First Army, VIII Corps pulled back to the west side of the Mulde river near the border of Czechoslovakia on 24 April 1945, where the corps was located when Germany surrendered on 8 May 1945.

Subordination

Campaign credits and Inactivation
VIII Corps is credited with service in the Normandy, Northern France, Rhineland, Ardennes-Alsace, and Central Europe campaigns. Headquarters, VIII Corps, was inactivated on 15 December 1945, at Camp Gruber, Oklahoma. The corps was subsequently activated and inactivated several times, with the last inactivation occurring on 1 April 1968 at Austin, Texas.

Commanders
 MG Edward Mann Lewis (December 1922 – January 1924)
 LTG Herbert J. Brees (1 October 1936 – 30 September 1940)
 LTG Walter Krueger (1 October 1940 – May 1941)
 MG George Veazey Strong (May 1941 – 1942)
 LTG Daniel Isom Sultan (1942 – December 1943)
 MG Emil F. Reinhardt (December 1943 – 14 March 1944)
 LTG Troy H. Middleton (15 March 1944 – 10 August 1945)
 MG Ira T. Wyche (10 August 1945 – 15 December 1945)

Chiefs of Staff
 BG Jay Leland Benedict (November 1940 – September 1941)
 BG Cyrus H. Searcy (1943–1945)

Artillery commanders
 BG John E. McMahon, Jr. (1943–1945)
 BG James F. Brittingham (June 1945 – December 1945)

References 

 Weigley, Russell F. (1981).  "Eisenhower's Lieutenants". Bloomington: Indiana University Press. .
 Williams, Mary H., compiler (1958).  "U.S. Army in World War II, Chronology 1941–1945". Washington D.C.: Government Printing Office.
 Wilson, John B., compiler (1999).  "Armies, Corps, Divisions, and Separate Brigades". Washington D.C.: Government Printing Office. .

The photo book Ragnarök (about the end of World War II and the US Army) by Anna Rosmus, 464 pp, with bilingual captions, published by Dorfmeister in Tittling, Germany, 2010, contains multiple images. Readers can see VIII Corps soldiers and their commanders crossing Germany, all the way to the Mulde River.

08
08
Military units and formations established in 1918
1918 establishments in the United States
Military units and formations disestablished in 1945